Allan Lurie (July 25, 1923 – March 10, 2015) was an American voice actor. He was also known as Al Laurie and Bert Stewart. He was the father of Peter Lurie, also a voice actor.

Career
Lurie is best known for his voice-over for Mezmaron in the 1982 cartoon Pac-Man and as Uglor the Alien in Space Stars. His name has constantly been shown in Hanna-Barbera cartoon credits, mostly as an additional voice.

He appeared on Gunsmoke in 1959 as a singer in the episode “Wind” (S4E28).

He later died on March 10, 2015.

Filmography

Animation
 A Pup Named Scooby-Doo - Additional Voices
 Foofur - Additional Voices (Season 2)
 Midnight Patrol: Adventures in the Dream Zone - Additional Voices
 Pac-Man - Mezmaron
 Pink Panther and Sons - Additional Voices
 Popeye and Son - Additional Voices
 Space Stars - Uglor
 The Adventures of Don Coyote and Sancho Panda - Additional Voices
 The Flintstone Kids - Additional Voices
 The Jetsons - Additional Voices (1985–1987)
 The New Yogi Bear Show - Additional Voices
 The Smurfs - Additional Voices
 Tom & Jerry Kids - Additional Voices

Film
 Hollyrock-a-Bye Baby - Additional Voices

Video games
 Blood Omen 2 (2002) - Bishop

Dubbing roles

Video games English dubbing
 Metal Gear Solid (1998) - Kenneth Baker
 Metal Gear Solid: The Twin Snakes (2004) - Kenneth Baker

References

External links
 
 

1923 births
2015 deaths
American male voice actors
American male video game actors
20th-century American male actors
21st-century American male actors
Male actors from Ohio
People from Hamilton, Ohio